Charles W. F. Dick (1858–1945), was a U.S. Senator from Ohio from 1904 to 1911. Senator Dick may also refer to:

Homer E. A. Dick (1884–1942), New York State Senate
Robert P. Dick (1823–1898), North Carolina State Senate

See also
John Adams Dix (1798–1879), U.S. Senator from New York from 1845 to 1849